The Erft is a river in North Rhine-Westphalia, Germany. It flows through the foothills of the Eifel, and joins the Lower Rhine  (left tributary). Its origin is near Nettersheim, and its mouth in Neuss-Grimlinghausen south of the Josef Cardinal Frings Bridge. Due to the open-pit mining of lignite in the Hambacher Loch, the flow of the river had to be changed.

The Erft gave its name to the town of Erftstadt, through which it flows, as well as to the Rhein-Erft district. It also flows through the towns of Bad Münstereifel, Euskirchen, Bergheim, Bedburg and Grevenbroich.

Gallery

References 

Rivers of North Rhine-Westphalia
 
Rivers of the Eifel
Rivers of Germany